Queen may refer to the following:

 , Henry III's great ship of 250 tons and no guns
 , transported convicts as part of the third fleet.
  was launched at Quebec in 1795. She made three voyages for the British East India Company (EIC) and then became a West Indiaman, trading between London and West Indies. She was last listed in 1813.
  was a steamship built by Pitcher, Northfleet. She was sold for breaking up in 1858.

See also
 Queen (disambiguation)
 , which lists five ships that sailed for the British East India Company between about 1701 and about 1802.
 

Ship names